Na Khun Yai is a subdistrict (tambon) in Nakhon Phanom Province, administered by Na Wa District in northeastern Thailand (Isan).

The village is about 900 km north of Bangkok. Na Khun Yai is underdeveloped, with agriculture as the main economic activity.

Geography
Neighboring subdistricts are Phon Suang (Si Songkhram District) to the north and east and Na Wa to the south and west.

History
The subdistrict was created on 1 May 1978, when five villages were split off from Na Wa.

Administration

The tambon is administered by a tambon administrative organization (TAO), which was created on 13 February 1997. It is subdivided into seven villages (mubans).

References

External links

nakoonyai.org Na Khun Yai TAO (Thai)
Na Khun Yai on Thaitambon.com (Thai)
Gallery of Na Khun Yai (private page)

Tambon of Nakhon Phanom Province
Populated places in Nakhon Phanom province
Isan
1978 establishments in Thailand